Chhatreshwori is a rural municipality located in Salyan District of Karnali Province of Nepal.

Demographics
At the time of the 2011 Nepal census, Chhatreshwori Rural Municipality had a population of 21,452. Of these, 98.9% spoke Nepali, 0.5% Magar, 0.3% Urdu, 0.1% Sign language and 0.2% other languages as their first language.

In terms of ethnicity/caste, 52.1% were Chhetri, 15.0% Magar, 12.1% Kami, 5.7% Thakuri, 4.3% Hill Brahmin, 4.3% Sarki, 3.8% Sanyasi/Dasnami, 1.8% Damai/Dholi, 0.4% Musalman and 0.5% others.

In terms of religion, 97.7% were Hindu, 0.9% Buddhist, 0.8% Christian, 0.4% Muslim and 0.2%.

References

|name                   = Chhetriswori municipality salyan
|other_name             =
|native_name            =

External links
 Official website

Populated places in Salyan District, Nepal
Rural municipalities in Karnali Province
Rural municipalities of Nepal established in 2017

|nickname               =
|settlement_type        = Municipality
|motto                  =

|image_skyline          =
|image_caption          =
|image_flag             =
|image_seal             =
|image_map              =
|mapsize                =
|map_caption            =
|pushpin_map            = Nepal
|pushpin_label_position = bottom
|pushpin_mapsize        = 300
|pushpin_map_caption    = Location in Nepal

|subdivision_type       = Country
|subdivision_name       = 
|subdivision_type1      = Zone
|subdivision_name1      = Rapti Zone
|subdivision_type2      = District
|subdivision_name2      = Salyan District
|
|government_footnotes   =